Scythris klimeschi is a moth of the family Scythrididae. It was described by Passerin d'Entrèves in 1983. It is found on the Canary Islands.

The wingspan is 9-11.5 mm.

The larvae have been recorded feeding on Salsola oppositifolia, Salsola longifolia and possibly Atriplex parvifolius.

References

klimeschi
Moths described in 1983